Qi Tian from the University of Texas at San Antonio was named Fellow of the Institute of Electrical and Electronics Engineers (IEEE) in 2016 for contributions to multimedia information retrieval.

References

External links
Qi Tian Homepage

Fellow Members of the IEEE
Living people
University of Texas at San Antonio faculty
Year of birth missing (living people)
Place of birth missing (living people)